Shirani (also Romanized as Shīrānī; also known as Shīrātī) is a village in Alan Rural District, in the Central District of Sardasht County, West Azerbaijan Province, Iran. At the 2006 census, its population was 81, in 17 families.

References 

Populated places in Sardasht County